Michele Gobbi (born August 10, 1977 in Vicenza) is a former Italian cyclist.

Palmares

1998
2nd Giro del Canavese
1999
1st European Road Race Champion
2002
3rd Gran Premio Industria e Commercio Artigianato Carnaghese
2003
1st stage 4 Giro del Trentino
1st Gran Premio Industria e Commercio Artigianato Carnaghese
1st Trofeo Città di Castelfidardo
2004
1st Giro del Friuli

References

1977 births
Living people
Italian male cyclists
Sportspeople from Vicenza
Cyclists from the Province of Vicenza